Elizabeth Saville Roberts  ( Saville; born 16 December 1964) is a Welsh politician, currently serving as the group leader of Plaid Cymru in the House of Commons. She has been the Member of Parliament (MP) for Dwyfor Meirionnydd since the general election in 2015.

Early life
Saville Roberts grew up in Eltham, London, before moving to Aberystwyth, Ceredigion aged 18, to study languages at Aberystwyth University. She worked in Welsh-medium further education.

Political career 
In 2004, she became a member of Gwynedd Council for Morfa Nefyn. In 2008, she became the authority's cabinet member for education.

At the 2015 United Kingdom general election, Saville Roberts became Plaid Cymru's first ever female MP when she was elected as the MP for Dwyfor Meirionnydd. She stood down as a councillor following the result, becoming Plaid's spokesperson for Home Affairs, Education, Health, Environment, Energy, Equalities and Local Government. In her maiden speech to Parliament, she emphasised her and Plaid Cymru's commitment to public education, and highlighted issues facing rural Wales.

In 2016, Saville Roberts introduced a bill to the House of Commons which tackled online bullying and cyber crime. She is the Chair of the All-Party Parliamentary Group on Digital Crime.

In February 2017, Saville Roberts argued in favour of introducing a US-style rape shield law to prevent cross-examination of rape victims' sexual history in courtrooms, and tabled a private members bill on the matter. The government launched an emergency review in response. She retained her seat in the 2017 snap general election with an increased majority. Following the 2017 election, she became the leader of Plaid's Westminster group and party spokesperson for Home Affairs, Justice, Business, Energy, Industrial Strategy, Women and Equalities. Later that year, she hinted about standing for the Welsh Assembly in 2021. Later that year in November 2017, she led calls for a system of electronic tagging to be implemented for domestic abusers and stalkers which would allow their victims to be alerted if they were near by.

In April 2018, Saville Roberts opposed UK involvement in the 2018 bombing of Damascus and Homs, which she described as a "tokenistic action" that would do "little to allay the human suffering on the ground in Syria nor to bring stability to the region." She also criticised Prime Minister Theresa May for not having given Parliament a vote on the air strikes before proceeding. In October 2018 she spoke in Irish in the House of Commons as she called on Northern Ireland Secretary of State Karen Bradley to implement an Irish Language Act. She is believed to be the first person to speak Irish in the House of Commons since February 1901.

On 7 March 2019, Saville Roberts was sworn in as a member of the Privy Council of the United Kingdom.
She is a member of the Joint Committee on the Draft Domestic Abuse Bill.

On 14 March 2019, Saville Roberts voted for an amendment tabled by members of The Independent Group for a second public vote on EU membership. She held her seat at the 2019 general election.

On 17 March 2021, Saville Roberts again spoke in Irish, this time to wish Irish people a happy St Patrick's Day. She also gave the message in Welsh, for which the Speaker Lindsay Hoyle told her off and stated that speaking Welsh was against parliamentary rules. Saville Roberts claimed afterwards that the incident displayed "Westminster's disdain for minority languages". Leader of the House, Jacob Rees-Mogg later referenced the incident and called Welsh "a foreign language". In response, Saville Roberts tweeted: "Jacob Rees-Mogg may not be aware, but Welsh is not a 'foreign language'. It had been spoken in Britain for hundreds of years before English even existed."

She has called for an independent Wales to rejoin the European Union. "Single market membership provides an immediate and clear solution to the problems wrought by recent Conservative failures," wrote Saville Roberts. "In the longer-term, we are building the case for an independent Wales at the top table of the European family."

Personal life 
Saville Roberts has lived in the village of Morfa Nefyn in Gwynedd with her husband, Dewi Wyn Roberts, since 1993. They married in 1994 and have twin daughters. Her mother, Nancy Saville (1933–2022), was a scientist and suffered from dementia. Saville Roberts has written openly about it, and the impact of COVID-19 lockdowns on people with the condition.

She is a cousin of the contemporary British artist Jenny Saville.

References

External links 
 
 
 

1964 births
Living people
Alumni of Aberystwyth University
Councillors in Wales
Female members of the Parliament of the United Kingdom for Welsh constituencies
Welsh-speaking politicians
Members of the Privy Council of the United Kingdom
People from Eltham
Plaid Cymru MPs
21st-century Welsh women
21st-century British women politicians
UK MPs 2015–2017
UK MPs 2017–2019
UK MPs 2019–present
Women councillors in Wales